Naoto Sago (佐合尚人, Sagō Naoto, is a Japanese karateka. He won the silver medal in the men's kumite −60 kg event at the 2018 World Karate Championships held in Madrid, Spain. He represented Japan at the 2020 Summer Olympics in karate. He competed in the men's 67 kg event where he did not advance to compete in the semifinals.

Achievements

References 

Living people
Place of birth missing (living people)
Japanese male karateka
Karateka at the 2020 Summer Olympics
1992 births
Olympic karateka of Japan
21st-century Japanese people